The SS Sinaia was an ocean liner built in 1924 in Whiteinch, Glasgow by Barclay, Curle & Co. Ltd.for the Fabre Line. Its first visit to Providence, Rhode Island, was made on June 28, 1925.

The liner carried Kahlil Gibran's body from Providence, Rhode Island, to Lebanon in 1931. In 1939, the SS Sinaia left the port of Sète with Spanish Republicans seeking asylum in Mexico.

The SS Sinaia was scuttled in 1944.

References

Ocean liners
Scuttled vessels